Bareless is a village in Northumberland, England.

Governance 
Bareless is in the parliamentary constituency of Berwick-upon-Tweed.

References

Villages in Northumberland